Der Kurier der Kaiserin is a German Television series. It was produced by ZDF and ORF and was broadcast from 1970 to 1971. German actor Klausjürgen Wussow portrays a courier for the Austrian ruler Maria Theresa in the period before and during the Seven Years' War.

External links
 

1970 German television series debuts
1971 German television series endings
Television series set in the 18th century
Television shows set in Austria
German-language television shows
ZDF original programming